André Lefèvre or Lefevre may refer to:

André Lefèvre (1717-1768), French contributor to the Encyclopédie
André Lefèvre (Scouting) (1887–1946), French Scouting notable
André Joseph Lefèvre (1869–1929), French Minister of Defence
André le Fèvre, Dutch footballer who competed at the 1924 Summer Olympics
André Lefevere, Belgian-American translation theorist

See also
 André Lefèbvre (1894-1964), French automobile engineer